Ma Hada La Hada is Najwa Karam's seventh studio album.

Track listing
 "El Tahady" (The competition)
 "Habib el-Zein" (My love)
 "El-Helw" (The beautiful one)
 "Ma Hada La Hada" (No one is for anybody)
 "Bedy Mnagem" (I want a magician)
 "Bthouthiq Feeyi" (You believe in me)
 "Bgareb Ensa" (I try to forget)

References

Najwa Karam albums
1997 albums
Rotana Records albums